Time dilation creationism is a form of young earth creationist interpretation of the Genesis creation narrative which tries to harmonize the existence of distant galaxies with the six days of Creation. The theory proposes that the universe experienced a rapid passage of time, while the earth itself experienced six literal days, because of time dilation. It is asserted that the time dilation mainly happened on the fourth day of creation.

Background and history 
Because of the problem of the distance of starlight, time dilation has been used by some young earth creationists to explain how starlight from the edge of the universe, around 13 billion light years away could travel to the Earth in less than 7000 years, thus it has been proposed that on the fourth day of creation, there was a type of time dilation which allowed the light to travel to the earth from the edge of the universe. However some young earth creationist organizations such as Answers in Genesis have said that the theory has "fatal problems". It has also been criticized for being "strained exegesis".

References 

 
Creation science
Pseudoscience